Amphixystis anchiala is a moth of the family Tineidae. It was described by Edward Meyrick in 1909 and is found in South Africa, Madagascar and from Nigeria.

This species has a wingspan of 13 mm, the forewings are dark fuscous with a rather broad whitish-ochreous dorsal stripe from base to apex. In general appearance it is similar to Amphixystis cymataula (Meyrick, 1926) from Zimbabwe, from which it can be distinguished by genitalia examination only.

The larvae have been recorded feeding on Euphorbia resinifera, Citrullus colocynthis (Cucurbitaceae), Dioscorea alata and Dioscorea rotundata (Dioscoreaceae).

References

Hieroxestinae
Moths described in 1909
Moths of Africa